The Sword of Light or  (Old Irish; modern  ) is a trope object that appears in a number of Irish and Scottish Gaelic folktales. The  "Quest for sword of light" formula is catalogued as motif H1337.

The sword appears commonly as a quest object in the Irish folktale of a hero seeking "The One Story" (or the "Cause of the one story about women"), which culminates in the discovery of a "Tale of the Werewolf" (a man magically turned wolf by an unfaithful wife). However, the sword is uninvolved in the man-wolf portion, and only figures in the hero-adventure frame story.

The sword of light,  according to a different commentator, is a fixture of an Irish tale group describable as a quasi-bridal-quest. This characterization is inspired by the formula where the hero gains a beautiful wife (and riches) by gambling against a gruagach aka wizard-champion, but suffers losses which makes him beholden to mount on a hopeless-seeming quest. Like the actual "giant's daughter" bridal quest tales, the sword of light hero often gains assistance of "helpful animals" in completing his tasks or ordeals.

The sword has been regarded as a legacy to the god-slaying weapons of Irish mythology by certain scholars, such as T. F. O'Rahilly, the analogues being the primeval Celtic deity's lightning-weapon, Lugh's sling that felled Balor, the hero Cúchulainn's supernatural spear Gae bulga and his shining sword Cruaidín Catutchenn.

Forms

The spelling as appears in published Irish texts and scholastic commentary is Claidheamh Soluis alternatively (an) cloidheamh solais; but these are pre-reform spelling, and in modernized reformed spelling Claíomh Solais would be used. The name has also been transliterated into Hiberno-English as chloive solais. The sword may be rendered in English as the "Sword of Light", or "Shining Sword".

Likewise, the Scottish Gaelic form is  "glaive of light", or  "White Glave of Light".

Overview 
The folk tales featuring the sword of light may be bridal quests, and the hero's would-be bride often becomes the hero's helper.

But also typically the story is a sort of quasi-bridal quest, where the hero wins a bride by wager, but then suffers a loss, becoming oath-bound (compelled by geis) to never come home until he has completed the quest for the sword (and other objectives). The opponent who tempts the hero with this gambling game is usually a gruagach ("wizard-champion") or wizard/druid. and the sword's keeper is often a giant or hag (cailleach), or a sibling of the wizard.

The sword-keeper oftentimes must be defeated (killed), which is not possible except by some secret means. Thus the hero or helper may resort to the sword of light as the only effective weapon against this enemy. But often the sword is not enough, and the supernatural enemy has to be attacked on a single vulnerable spot. The weak spot, moreover, may be an external soul (motif index E710) concealed somewhere in the world at large (inside animals, etc.); or, as in the case of "The Young King Of Easaidh Ruadh", this external soul is encased within a nested series of animals.

Typically bound up with the quest for the sword of light is the quest for the "One Story" (' truth about women'), namely, the story of the faithless wife who transforms her husband into a wolf.

The hero in some examples are compelled to perform (three) sets of tasks, aided by helpers, who may be the would-be bride, "helpful animals", or a supernatural being ("little green/red man").

Texts 

Below are the lists of tales where the sword of light occurs. Kittredge's sigla (K J L C1 O'F H c m) are given in boldface:

Irish folktales 

 "The Story of the Sculloge's son from Muskerry (Sceal Vhic Scoloige)" K
 (in-tale) "Fios Fath an aon Sceil" (perfect narrative of the unique story)"
 "Adventure of the Sgolog and the Red" (GruagachEachtra air an sgolóig agus air an ngruagach ruadh) (Gaelic Journal) J
 "The Weaver's Son and the Giant of the White Hill", (Myths and Folk-lore of Ireland).
 "The Thirteenth Son of the King of Erin" ( Curtin, Myths)
 Leaduidhe na luaithe ("Ashypet" or "The Lazy Fellow") (Ó Fotharta/O'Foharty/O'Faherty (1892))
 "Smallhead and the King's Sons" (Curtin (1892), repr.  No. XXXIX)
 "Baranoir, son of a King in Erin, and the Daughter of King under the Wave"  (Curtin (1893), repr.  ed. Béaloideas 12 (1/2))
 "Morraha; Brian More, son of the high-king of Erin, from the Well of Enchantments of Binn Edin" (repr. ) L
 "Simon and Margaret" (Larminie)
 "Beauty of the World" (Larminie)
 "The King who had Twelve Sons" (Larminie)
 "Cud, Cad, and Micad", (Hero-tales of Ireland).
 "Coldfeet and Queen of Lonesome Island", (Curtin, Hero-tales)
 "Art and Balor Beimenach", (Curtin, Hero-tales). C1
 "The Shining Sword and the Knowledge of the Cause of the One Story about Women" (ZCP 1)) O’F
 "The King of Ireland's Son (Mac Riġ Eireann)" (Beside the Fire)
Mac Rígh Eireann agus Ceann Gruagach na g-Cleasann "The king's son of Ireland and the chief-magician's with his tricks" (No. XXIX, Annales de Bretagne ) H
 "The Snow, Crow, and the Blood".
 An untitled tale of Finn's three sons by the Queen of Italy collected at Glenties in Donegal
 An Claiḋeaṁ Soluis: agus Fios-fáṫa-'n-aoin-scéil "The Sword of Light and the knowledge of the motive of the unique (?) tale" ( in Béaloideas 1).
 Fios ḃás an an-sgéalaiḋe agus an Claiḋeaṁ Solais "Knowledge of death of the Ansgéalidhe (Storyteller) and the Sword of Light" (  in Béaloideas 4).

Scottish Gaelic folktales 
The publication of tales from the Highlands (Popular Tales of the West Highlands) predate the Irish tales becoming available in print.

 "The Young King Of Easaidh Ruadh" (No. 1) c
 "Widow's Son" (Campbell, No. 2, 2nd variant)
 "Tale of Conal Crovi" (Campbell, No. 6)
 "Tale of Connal" (Campbell, No. 7)
 "Maol a Chliobain" (Campbell, No. 17)
 "The Widow and her Daughters" (Campbell, No. 41, 2nd variant)
 "Mac Iain Direach" (Campbell, No. 46)
 "An Sionnach, the Fox" (Campbell, No. 46, 4th variant;)
 "The Herding of Cruachan (Buachaillechd Chruachain)" (No. 4.) m
 "The History of Kitty Ill-Pretts" (No. 21)

Commentary 

The sword of light (or glaive of light) is a trope artefact that occurs in a number of Gaelic tales. It also occurs in Irish folktales also, as described below. The "Quest for sword of light" (H1337) motif is also listed in Stith Thompson's Motif-Index of Folk-Literature.

Grouping

One strand of the "sword of light" tale has been transmitted in French Canada as the tale of the "Sword of Wisdom", and assigned type 305A. However, the Irish cognate had not been catalogued as a tale type by Aarne-Thompson, though recognized in The Types of the Irish Folktale.

One Story and Werewolf's Tale
The quest for the sword of light is an added layer, attached to the core tale of the quest for "the one story", which forms a frame story to the Irish versions of the medieval werewolf tale, according to George Lyman Kittredge's 1903 study.

"The one story" is actually shorthand, and Kittredge generally uses "the cause of the one story about women", as occurs in O'Foharta's version. Similar titles or sub-titles occur in Irish as well. The form "news of the death of Anshgayliacht" in "Morraha", is deemed to be a corruption.

The werewolf tale, recounted by a man who had once been magically transformed into a wolf by an unfaithful wife, is analyzed by Kittredge for its compound structure, but the in-tale generally does not concern the Sword of Light.

It is pointed out that in the sword of light fails to occur in the Scottish version of the werewolf tale, replaced by the hero obtaining custody of the werewolf himself, by bartering his horse.

Quasi-bridal quest

Some tales fall into an actual bridal-quest pattern. In "The Thirteenth Son of the King of Erin", Sean Ruadh (actually the eldest prince) is assisted by the princess who is his would-be bride in slaying the urfeist (sea-serpent). And in the "Widow's Son", the hero promises marriage to the giant's daughter, who also becomes the hero's helper.

Josef Baudiš suggested a slightly different grouping, which similar to the bridal-quest type but distinguishably different: the hero wins a beautiful wife (and riches) as wager in a game played against a gruagach (wizard-champion) figure, but it is a trap, and when the hero suffers a loss, he is compelled to go on a quest, usually for the sword of light.

Helpful animals

Kittredge has recognized the presence of "helpful animals" assisting the hero in the tales, catalogued in the range of Types B300–590, "Helpful Animals" in Thompson's Motif-Index. Kittedge recognizes the Skilful Companions motif in the werewolf in-story, but that portion does not much concern the sword, as aforementioned.

In O'Foharta's Irish text (O'F) the helpers are a hawk, otter, and a fox ("Hawk of the Grey Wood", the "Otter of the Endless Tempests", and the "Fox of the Pleasant Crag"). In Campbell's Scottish The Young King of Easaidh Ruadh (c text), the helpers are a dog, hawk, and an otter ("slim dog of the greenwood", "hoary hawk of the grey rock", and "brown otter of the river"). In McInnes's Scottish version (m text) there are not three, but four animals.

It might be noted that Irish bridal quest of the "giant's daughter" type is recognized as an equivalent to folktale to the Six Go through the Whole World type (ATU 513A), and this type features "magical helpers" or "extraordinary helpers".

The secret about women

In the Irish folktale, the hero goes on quest for ' The Only Story' which is thought to mean  ' truth about women '. That meaning is illuminated in versions that provide a more fuller title, e. g., "The Shining Sword and the Knowledge of the Cause of the One Story about Women", This has been corrupted to "news of the death of Anshgayliacht" in the L (Larminie) version.

Kittredge considered the "secret about women" element to be an essential and original part of the Irish story, as seen in the stemma of texts given by him, even though the "woman" part of it has been lost in some variants, such as Kennedy's Fios Fath an aon Sceil ("perfect narrative of the unique story")

A more familiar Arthurian tale perhaps than Arthur and Gorlagon which embeds the quest of "What is it that women most desire?" is The Wedding of Sir Gawain and Dame Ragnelle.

External soul motif
The external soul motif in Sword of Light stories have been noted for example by Gerard Murphy.

The tale "The Young King Of Easaidh Ruadh" was also given as a typical example of "External soul" motif (E 710) by folklorist Katharine Mary Briggs. It has been pointed out that the Easaidh Ruadh refers to a place name in Ireland, probably the Assaroe Falls in Ballyshannon, County Donegal.

A similar Irish tale involving the "external soul" is the Donegal tale "Hung up Naked Man" (Irish title: "Éamonn Ua Ciórrthais(?)" ed. E. C. Quiggin), studied by Roger Sherman Loomis. While Loomis does not explicitly state a connection to the sword of light, he remarks that there is parallel to the Irish giant Cú roí whom he describes a "solar host" or "solar divinity", and notes that Cú roí was "slain with his own sword", (as according to the narrative Aided Chon Roí in which Cú roí's wife Blaíthíne reveals the weakness).

Three attempts
In the specimen collected by Kennedy, the hero is assisted by the king who is his own father-in-law, who happens to be the brother of the sword owner, and the hero's antagonist, the Druid demanding the sword.

The Sculloge's rides forth to the dwelling of the sword owner three times, his horse being hacked by the sword in the first two tries, but succeeding on the third. The three time's the charm element that occurs here is also present in the Morraha tale collected by Larminie.

As a mythological sword 
The assertion has been made that Claidheamh Soluis is "a symbol of Ireland attributed in oral tradition to Cúchulainn" (James Mackillop), although none of the tales listed above name Cuchulainn as protagonist. T. F. O'Rahilly only went as far as to suggests that the "sword of light" in folk tales was a vestige of divine weapons and heroic weapons, such as Cúchulainn's shining sword Cruaidín Catutchenn, whose name means ‘the Hard-headed Steeling’. This sword (aka "Socht's sword") is said to have "shone at night like a candle" according to a version of Echtrae Cormaic ("Adventures of Cormac mac Airt").

T. F. O'Rahilly's schema, roughly speaking, the primeval divine weapon was a fiery and bright lightning weapon, most often conceived of as a throwing spear; in later traditions, the wielder would change from god to hero, and spear tended to be replaced by sword. From the heroic cycles, some prominent examples are Fergus Mac Roigh's sword Caladbolg and Mac Cecht's spear. But Caladbolg does not manifest as a blazing sword, and the latter which does emit fiery sparks is a spear, thus failing to fit the profile of a sword which shines. One example which does fit, is Cúchulainn's sword Cruaidín Catutchenn which was aforementioned. And the legacy of these mythological and heroic weapons (Lug's lighting-weapon, his "son" Cúchulainn's remarkable sword, etc. ) survive in the "sword of light" in folklore.

Connection to Arthuriana 

A broad sweeping parallel has been made between the light or lightning weapons of Celtic tradition and King Arthur's Excalibur, described as brightly shining in several places of the Vulgate cycle Roman de Merlin. Similar passages obviously occur in Thomas Malory's Le Morte d'Arthur, which uses this as a source.

Wounding by one's own sword

A more precise parallel which has been argued is that just as the sword of light in Irish and Scottish folktales contain a "(fatal) wounding by one's own sword" motif, the Arthurian cycle contains an episode where Arthur is imperiled by his own sword, Excalibur. In the Huth Merlin, Morgan le Fay plots to have Arthur killed with his own Excalibur, by stealing the sword for her lover Accalon, who unbeknownst fights his lord King Arthur with it. The Lady of the Lake intercedes at the right moment to prevent Arthur's death. The episode has been copied by Malory as well (with the knight being called Accolon unlike the French original)

Sleeping giant
Dáithí Ó hÓgáin deduces that certain properties of the sword of light (such as screaming when touched in order to alert its owner) is likely borrowed from Arthurian material, because there is evidence that a version of Fios Fatha an Aonsceil ('the knowledge of the cause of the One Story') had been told about Gearóid Iarla (Earl Gerald FitzGerald) of the 14th century, whose family had close ties with Arthurian tradition. To the Earl is attached a Barbarossa legend (King asleep in mountain motif), which makes the figure conducive to be transformed into a "sleeping giant" of folktale.

Grail sword
Other commentators have equated the Sword of Light to the Grail sword. Loomis also suggested that the sword obtained by Cei (Sir Kay) in the Welsh tale Culhwch and Olwen (i.e., the sword of Gwrnach the giant) must be "related to the sword of light which is the object of the Irish and Scottish folk-tales".

See also 
 Lugh's spear
 Lúin of Celtchar
 Irish mythology in popular culture
 Four Treasures of the Tuatha Dé Danann
 Nuada Airgetlám

Explanatory notes

References
Citations

Bibliography

Irish or Scottish Gaelic texts, some with translations
  Vol. I II)
 
 
 
 

Translations or tales collected in English

 
 
 
  
 
 ; text via Internet Archive

Critical studies

 
 
 
 
 
 
 

 
 

Popularized versions
 , a composite retelling.

External links
 Celtic Objects
 Encyclopaedia of the Celts

Mythological cycle
Ulster Cycle
Mythological swords